Craig Rogerson (born 15 July 1965) is an Australian former diver who competed in the 1988 Summer Olympics and in the 1992 Summer Olympics. After taking a few years off he returned in the Atlanta 1996 Summer Olympics, ranking 12th in the platform event. He is openly gay.

At the 1986 Commonwealth Games, he won the gold medal in the Men's 10m Platform and the bronze medal in the Men's 3m Springboard.

References

1965 births
Living people
Gay sportsmen
Olympic divers of Australia
Divers at the 1988 Summer Olympics
Divers at the 1992 Summer Olympics
Australian Institute of Sport divers
Divers at the 1986 Commonwealth Games
Divers at the 1990 Commonwealth Games
Commonwealth Games medallists in diving
Commonwealth Games gold medallists for Australia
Commonwealth Games bronze medallists for Australia
Australian LGBT sportspeople
LGBT divers
Australian male divers
21st-century LGBT people
Medallists at the 1986 Commonwealth Games
Medallists at the 1990 Commonwealth Games